Suzanne Brockmann (born 1960) is an American romantic fiction writer. She lives near Boston, Massachusetts, with her husband, Ed Gaffney, and their two children, Melanie and Jason T. Gaffney. She has also written works under the name Anne Brock.

Biography
Brockmann attended Boston University's School of Broadcasting and Film majoring in film and minoring in creative writing before dropping out to join a band. Afterwards, she met her husband and started a family. It was after having her second child that Brockmann started writing. Initially, she focused on television scripts, screen plays and Star Trek novels but after doing research she decided to focus her efforts on the romance genre. Her first published novel, Future Perfect in 1993, was written along with nine other manuscripts in 1992 after her decision to publish a romance novel.

In 1996, Brockmann published the first in her Tall, Dark & Dangerous series. The series develops among a fictional group of US Navy SEALs. The books following in the series, and that of the Troubleshooters, Inc. series, are all classified in a subgenre known as "military/romantic suspense".

Brockmann has attracted the attention of magazines such as Out and Bay Windows, both of which serve the gay community, due to a subplot dealing with the romance of an openly gay character in her Troubleshooters, Inc. series. Brockmann has said that she is a PFLAG mom, supporting her gay son, Jason, and dedicating her 2004 book Hot Target to him. In 2007, Brockmann donated the profits of her holiday novella, All Through the Night, to MassEquality.

In 2014, she began writing a young adult paranormal trilogy, Night Sky, with her daughter, Melanie Brockmann.

Awards
Brockmann is twice winner of the RITA Award from the Romance Writers of America. She has also appeared on the Romance Writers of America Honor Roll for having appeared on both the USA Today and the New York Times Best Sellers lists. She has been the recipient of the Romantic Times Reviewers' Choice Awards in 1996, 1998 and 1999, as well as the Romantic Times Career Achievement Award for Series Romance in 1997, 2000 and 2002.

List of works
Tall, Dark and Dangerous
Prince Joe, Silhouette Intimate Moments, June 1996, reissued by Mira, May 2002
Forever Blue, Silhouette Intimate Moments, October 1996, reissued by Mira, February 2003
Frisco's Kid, Silhouette Intimate Moments, January 1997, reissued by Mira, June 2003
Everyday, Average Jones, Silhouette Intimate Moments, August 1998
Harvard's Education, Silhouette Intimate Moments, October 1998
It Came Upon a Midnight Clear (Revised in 2005 to "Hawken's Heart"), Silhouette Intimate Moments, December 1998
Admiral's Bride, Silhouette Intimate Moments, November 1999
Identity: Unknown, Silhouette Intimate Moments, January 2000
Get Lucky, Silhouette Intimate Moments, March 2000
Taylor's Temptation, Silhouette Intimate Moments, July 2001
Night Watch, Silhouette Intimate Moments, September 2003
SEAL Camp, 2018
King's Ransom, 2020

Troubleshooters
Unsung Hero, Ivy, June 2000
Defiant Hero, Ivy, March 2001
Over the Edge, Ivy, September 2001Out of Control, Ballantine, March 2002Into the Night, Ballantine, November 2002Gone Too Far, Ballantine, July 2003Flashpoint, Ballantine, March 2004Hot Target, Ballantine, December 2004Breaking Point, Ballantine, July 2005Into the Storm, Ballantine, November 2006Force of Nature, Ballantine, August 2007All Through the Night, Ballantine, October 2007Into the Fire, Ballantine, July 2008Dark of Night, Ballantine, 2009Hot Pursuit, Ballantine, July 2009Breaking the Rules, Ballantine, March 2011Do or Die, Ballantine, Reluctant Heroes #1, February 2014Some Kind of Hero, Ballantine, July 11, 2017

Troubleshooters - Short stories and NovellasWhen Tony Met Adam, Ballantine e-short story, June 2011Beginnings and Endings, Ballantine e-short story, June 2012Headed for Trouble, Ballantine, TS short story anthology, May 2013Free Fall, e-short story, December 2014Home Fire Inferno, e-short story, May 2015Ready to Roll, e-short story, Fall 2016Murphy's Law, a Navy SEAL e-short, originally published March 2001

Stand alone novelsFuture Perfect, Meteor Kismet, August 1993Hero Under Cover, Silhouette Intimate Moments, June 1994Embraced By Love, Pinnacle, January 1995Not Without Risk, Silhouette Intimate Moments, June 1995A Man to Die For, Silhouette Intimate Moments, December 1995No Ordinary Man, Harlequin Intrigue, April 1996Kiss and Tell, Bantam Loveswept, May 1996The Kissing Game, Bantam Loveswept, December 1996Otherwise Engaged, Bantam Loveswept, February 1997Forbidden, Bantam Loveswept, April 1997Stand-In Groom, Bantam Loveswept, June 1997Ladies' Man, Bantam Loveswept, August 1997Time Enough For Love, Bantam Loveswept, November 1997Give Me Liberty, Precious Gems, Fall 97 (as Anne Brock)Love With the Proper Stranger, Silhouette Intimate Moments, January 1998Freedom's Price, Bantam Loveswept, February 1998Body Language, Bantam Loveswept, May 1998Heart Throb, Fawcett, March 1999Undercover Princess, Silhouette Intimate Moments, December 1999Bodyguard, Fawcett, December 1999Letters to Kelly, Silhouette Intimate Moments, April 2003Scenes of Passion, Silhouette Desire, July 2003Infamous, Ballantine, July 2010Born to Darkness'', Ballantine, March 2012

References

External links
Official website

American women novelists
American romantic fiction writers
1960 births
Living people
RITA Award winners
Boston University College of Communication alumni
20th-century American novelists
21st-century American novelists
Women romantic fiction writers
20th-century American women writers
21st-century American women writers